Remixed is the third album released by the classical crossover string quartet Bond.

Track listing

Japanese edition
"Victory" (Sharp Boys wild string edit) 
"Viva!" (Orion mix)
"Wintersun" (Bobby D' Ambrosio mix)
"Speed" (Crash club mix – radio edit)
"Fuego" (Caliente mix)
"Homecoming"
"Viva!" (!Del underground mix)
"Atlanta"
"Shine" (Dubshakra mix)
"Time"
"Bond On Bond"¹ (Hectic mix)
"Duel" (Indonesian mix)
"Jingle Bell Rock"
"Innocent"

US edition
"Viva!" (Orion mix)
"Victory" (Sharp Boys wild string edit) 
"Wintersun" (Bobby D' Ambrosio mix) 
"Speed" (Crash club mix – radio edit) 
"Fuego" (Caliente mix)
"Homecoming"
"Atlanta"
"Shine" (Dubshakra mix) 
"Time" 
"Duel" (Hectic mix)
"Bond On Bond" (Hectic mix)¹
"Jingle Bell Rock" (Pussy Galore mix)

¹Adapted from the "James Bond Theme"

Bond (band) albums
2003 remix albums
Decca Records remix albums